Office of the Auditor General is an independent office established to audit government bodies and report on their management of allocated funds. The current Auditor General is Pulane Letebele.

Roles 
The role of the Auditor General is to:

 Within six months after the end of each financial year, the Auditor-General shall audit and report, in respect of that financial year, on:
 Accounts of the national and local governments
 Accounts of all funds and authorities of the national and county governments;
 Accounts of all courts
 Accounts of every commission and independent office established by the Constitution
 the accounts of the National Assembly
 The public debt
 Accounts of any other entity that legislation requires the Auditor General to audit.
 The Auditor General may audit and report on the accounts of any entity that is funded from public funds.

Reports 
The Auditor-General is mandated to do the following through the audit reports:

 An audit report shall confirm whether or not public money has been applied lawfully and in an effective way.
 Audit reports shall be submitted to Parliament or the relevant county assembly
 Within three months after receiving an audit report, Parliament or the county assembly shall debate and consider the report and take appropriate action.

References

External links 

 

Government audit
Government of Botswana
Financial reporting